Fernando Isaac Ruíz Alvarado (born November 10, 1996, in San Luis Río Colorado, Sonora) is a professional Mexican footballer who currently plays for Pioneros de Cancún.

References

1996 births
Living people
Footballers from Sonora
Sportspeople from San Luis Río Colorado
Mexican footballers
Association football defenders
Altamira F.C. players
FC Juárez footballers
La Piedad footballers
Pioneros de Cancún footballers
Ascenso MX players
Liga Premier de México players
Tercera División de México players